John Young was a tavern keeper and a member of the Parliament of England for Marlborough for the parliament of 1559.

References

External links 

Members of Parliament for Marlborough
English MPs 1559
Year of birth unknown
Year of death unknown
Publicans